In infectious disease modelling, a who acquires infection from whom (WAIFW) matrix is a matrix that describes the rate of transmission of infection between different groups in a population, such as people of different ages. Used with an SIR model, the entries of the WAIFW matrix can be used to calculate the basic reproduction number using the next generation operator approach.

Examples 

The  WAIFW matrix for two groups is expressed as  where  is the transmission coefficient from an infected member of group  and a susceptible member of group . Usually specific mixing patterns are assumed.

Assortative mixing 
Assortative mixing occurs when those with certain characteristics are more likely to mix with others with whom they share those characteristics. It could be given by
Disassortative mixing is instead when .

Homogenous mixing 
Homogenous mixing, which is also dubbed random mixing, is given by
. Transmission is assumed equally likely regardless of group characteristics when a homogenous mixing WAIFW matrix is used. Whereas for heterogenous mixing, transmission rates depend on group characteristics.

Asymmetric mixing 

It need not be the case that . Examples of asymmetric WAIFW matrices are

Social contact hypothesis 

The hypothesis states that transmission rates are proportional to contact rates,  and allows for social contact data to be used in place of WAIFW matrices.

See also 
 Transmission risks and rates
 Mathematical modelling of infectious disease
 Next-generation matrix

References 

Matrices
Epidemiology
Mathematical and theoretical biology
Medical statistics